Khooni Raat is a 1991 Bollywood horror film starring Javed Khan Beena Banerjee and Huma Khan. It was rated 3 out of 5 stars. It is written and directed by J.D. Lawrence.

Plot

Cast

Soundtrack

References

External links

1991 films
1990s Hindi-language films
Films scored by Usha Khanna